Eske Brun (May 25, 1904 – October 11, 1987) was a high civil servant in Greenland and in relation to Greenland from 1932 to 1964.

Early life and career 

Eske Brun was born in Aalborg in the northern part of Jutland, Denmark. Eske Brun was baptized on the 12th of July, 1904, at Ålborg Vor Frue parish. Aalborg County. DK. His father, Charles Brun (Denmark) died when he was 15, on January 28, 1919, at the age of 52. Eske Brun and his mother, Rigmor Hansen (Including two sisters and three brothers) moved to Ordrup north of Copenhagen. He began studying in 1922, and received a law-degree from the University of Copenhagen in 1929. In 1932, at the age of 28, Eske Brun first visited Greenland, and was given a substitute job as governor of North Greenland situated in Godhavn, Greenland. In 1939 he got a permanent position as governor. On September 17, 1937, Copenhagen, Denmark, Eske Brun married Ingrid Winkel.

World War II and ensuing service 
When World War II began and the connection to Copenhagen (the capital of the Kingdom of Denmark, which Greenland was a part of) was severed, on account of the German occupation, (Operation Weserübung.) and his colleague Aksel Svane, via the law concerning the government of Greenland of 1925, took control of the island, becoming de facto "Independent.". But during the occupation, Greenland had had increased self-determination because the Danish political system was in shambles, they established supply-lines from the United States and Canada with the help of the Danish ambassador in Washington, Henrik Kauffmann. From 1941 until the end of the war, Aksel Svane was situated in the U.S. to organize the supplies and Eske Brun became governor of South Greenland as well. The administration was centralized in Godthåb (Nuuk).

Greenland under Eske Brun's Administration 
Greenland was effectively able to survive reasonably well during the conflict with at least the majority of aspects in wartime existence, with the Ivittut Cryolite mine being a major contribution in keeping Greenland stable. Ivittut, having held the world's largest reserve of naturally occurring Cryolite, a mineral that was used in the manufacturing of fighter planes and aluminum, there was a genuine fear was that;

“one well-directed shot from the deck gun of a German submarine or a clever act of sabotage by one of the workmen could have seriously damaged the cryolite mine, might have perhaps put it out of operation and thereby disrupted the Canadian aluminum industry, on which Allied aircraft production was heavily dependent. To prevent this, the local authorities had organized a mine guard armed with rifles and a few machine guns and had obtained from the United States a 3-inch Anti-Aircraft Gun manner by former U.S. Coast Guard gunners.".

Were this fear realized, then this would have negatively impacted the production of Aluminum, seeing its usage in it, and the production of Aircraft for the war effort would have been hampered significantly, which would have most certainly damaged the Allied war effort, if not destroyed production of aeronautic weaponry  entirely in the United States and Canada. Cryolite is used as a solvent for bauxite in the electrolytic production of aluminum and has various other metallurgical applications, and is used in the glass and enamel industries, and Aluminum is used in aircraft due to its lightweight nature. Supplies were provided by the United States and included surveying operations to scout the Greenlandic coastline, the patrols' effectiveness was decreased significantly with the poor weather of the area.

Establishment of the Sirius Dog Sled Patrol 
Eske Brun, instead of deciding to request the requisition of additional naval expeditions to the coast of Greenland, as the patrols were, decided that Greenland must have a defensive military force protecting itself. Greenlandic self-sufficiency was among another reason, that being to report any suspected or actual presence of the landings of hostile German military forces. Brun made an appeal to Greenland's guides and hunters to join an elite unit tasked with patrolling the most remote areas of the colony. Using the rifles left by the Americans, he directed the creation of what became the Sirius Dog Sled Patrol (Slædepatruljen Sirius). The 15 man volunteer team was made up of native Inuit, Danish colonists, and Norwegian expatriates. Though Ib Poulsen would be the "Chief" of the Patrol. Additionally, the patrol's establishment and continued service had a significant and positive impact on Allied morale [relevant to the location.], and a morale-supportive goal, the specter of it -and, Greenland as a whole's- continued resistance demonstrated clearly, without any obfuscation, to the occupying United States forces that the Greenlandic, and, by extension, Danish people were willing to defy Germany, without regard, German forces did achieve their object. That being, the successful establishment of covert weather stations on the Greenlandic coastline, the creation of which was able to transmit information to Nazi German U-Boats with intelligence regarding weather conditions in Northern Europe. There were few engagements between the German expeditions and the Patrol, yet the few skirmishes and mild engagements that did in fact occur were enough to cause Axis forces to eventually capitulate and withdraw, amongst other reasons for their defeat.

The U.S. Coast Guard Cutter, the Nanok (Inuit word for "Polar Bear.".), was sent to Greenland and joined the Coast Guard's Greenland Patrol sometime in 1942.

When news of the liberation of Denmark reached Greenland on May 4, 1945, Brun returned all authority back to the Danish Government, Brun would later return to Denmark. The next day, when Denmark was liberated proper, on May 5, 1945, Danish liberty from German occupation took effect. The event was celebrated in Nuuk.

Later life 
After the war Eske Brun was made vice-president of the Greenland Administration (Grønlands Styrelse) (in 1947). In January 1949 he succeeded Knud Oldendow as president.
Eske Brun worked as a senior official until his voluntary retirement in 1964 after disputes concerning equality between Danes and Greenlanders.

Eske Brun was buried in the Humlebæk Cemetery, Zealand, Denmark, following his death on October 11, 1987, in Soelleroed, Zealand, Denmark. No document revealing Eske Brun's cause of death has ever been uncovered. 

It is somewhat debated amongst Greenlanders as to if Eske Brun was the "Originator" of "Modern Greenland", with little discussion remaining due to the obscure nature of his existence. Eske Brun is also portrayed in Philatelic Pursuits.

References

1904 births
1987 deaths
People from Aalborg
Danish emigrants to Greenland
Governors of Greenland
Danish people of World War II